Kunwar (also spelt Kanwar or Kuar or Kaur) is a title denoting the Prince.

It is feudal title originating from the Indian subcontinent meaning "Son of Thakur" where Thakur means "Lord", “God” or “Master of the estate.”

It is a title that belongs to a Rajput, a caste in western, central, northern India and Pakistan. The title is also adopted by Thakuri royals of Western Nepal. .

People with title Kunwar includes:
 Kunwar Khalid Yunus (Member of National Assembly of Pakistan)
 Kunwar Amar
 Kunwar Narayan
 Kunwar Natwar Singh
 Kunwar Vikram Singh
 Kunwar Sone Singh Ponwar
 Kunwar Manvendra Singh
 Kunwar Digvijay Singh
 Kunwar Natwar Singh
 Kunwar Sarvraj Singh
 Kunwar Sarvesh Kumar Singh
 Kunwar Rewati Raman Singh
 Kunwar Singh (cricketer)
 Kunwar Jitin Prasad
 Kunwar Bhim Singh
 Kunwar Nau Nihal Singh
 Kunwar Inderjit Singh; 20th Prime Minister of Nepal. Royalty of Doti Region. Born as Indradhwoj Shahi later adopted title of Kunwar

References

Titles in India
Titles in Pakistan
Indian feudalism
Titles of national or ethnic leadership
Hindi words and phrases
Bengali words and phrases